Koen Verweij (born 26 August 1990) is a former Dutch speed skater and inline speed skater. At the end of the skating season 2008–09 he made a transfer from the Jong Oranje team of the national skating union (KNSB) to the commercial team of TVM.

Verweij was the holder of the Dutch national record at the 1500 metres distance from 9 December 2017 until 10 March 2019.

Biography
On 30 December 2007 Verweij skated his first 10 km race at the Dutch all-round championships at the Kardinge ice track in Groningen. He finished the tournament in fifth position which resulted in his qualification as first reserve skater for the European all-round championship in Kolomna. This was a remarkable accomplishment, since he was a junior at that moment, and posted faster times than Sven Kramer skated at the same age. 

Later in the same season he participated in the world junior championships in Changchun. He won the silver medal just behind his teammate Jan Blokhuijsen and in front of his other teammate Berden de Vries. It was the first time since 1997 that all medals were captured by skaters from the same country.

At the Dutch all-round championships 2009, Verweij finished 4th, partly due to his strong improvement of his 10 km personal record, and qualified for the European all-round championships. Despite a fall on the 500 m he managed to finish the tournament in 12th position. His season was crowned with a victory at the World Junior Skating championships where he won the 3000 m, the 5000 m, the all-round title, and the team pursuit. Because of these outstanding results he won the Egbert van't Oever Encouragement award for the best young Dutch skater.

At the 2014 Olympic Games Verweij finished 2nd in the 1500m event, 0.003 seconds behind Zbigniew Bródka.

On 14 July 2015 he announced that he was leaving Team Corendon after one season.

Records

Personal records

Verweij reached 5th position in the adelskalender on 15 November 2013. As of 10 March 2019, he is in 9th position with 145.915 points

World Records

 * together with Sven Kramer and Jan Blokhuijsen

Tournament overview

Source:

World Cup overview

 Source: 
 – = Did not participate
 (b) = Division B
 DNS = Did not start
 DNQ = Did not qualify
 DQ = Disqualified
 NC = No classification

Medals won

References

1990 births
Living people
Dutch male speed skaters
Speed skaters at the 2014 Winter Olympics
Speed skaters at the 2018 Winter Olympics
Olympic speed skaters of the Netherlands
People from Langedijk 
Medalists at the 2014 Winter Olympics
Medalists at the 2018 Winter Olympics
Olympic gold medalists for the Netherlands
Olympic silver medalists for the Netherlands
Olympic bronze medalists for the Netherlands
Olympic medalists in speed skating
World Allround Speed Skating Championships medalists
World Single Distances Speed Skating Championships medalists
Sportspeople from North Holland